Chalbaud is a surname. Notable people with the surname include:

 Carlos Delgado Chalbaud (1909–1950), Venezuelan president and military officer
 Flor María Chalbaud (born 1921), Venezuelan First Lady
 José-Antonio Chalbaud (born 1931), Venezuelan sports shooter
 Román Chalbaud (born 1931), Venezuelan film director and screenwriter
 Román Delgado Chalbaud (1882–1929), Venezuelan naval officer, businessman and conspirator